Southern Sons is the self-titled debut album by Australian band Southern Sons. The album was released in Australia through Wheatley Records (best known as John Farnham's label) in June 1990 and reached number 5 on the ARIA charts.  A total of 4 singles were released from the album.

At the ARIA Music Awards of 1991, the album was nominated for ARIA Award for Breakthrough Artist – Album, but lost to Safety in Numbers by Margaret Urlich.

The album was re-released in 2009 by Sony BMG and was also released in the Australian iTunes Store as a digital download in 2010.

Track listing
 "Always And Ever" (P. Buckle) – 3:58
 "Which Way" (P. Buckle) – 3:56
 "Living This Way" (P. Bowman, P. Buckle) – 3:05
 "Heart in Danger" (P. Buckle) – 4:58
 "Hold Me in Your Arms" (P. Buckle) – 4:05
 "Something More" (P. Buckle) – 3:40
 "Waiting For That Train" (P. Buckle, P. Bowman) – 3:43
 "More Than Enough" (P. Bowman, P. Buckle) – 3:41
 "Hold On To The Memory" (P. Buckle, V. Donati) – 4:12
 "The World Is Mine" (P. Buckle) – 3:47
 "What I See" (P. Buckle, P. Bowman) – 3:33

Personnel
Jack Jones – lead vocals, guitars
 Phil Buckle – guitars, backing vocals
Virgil Donati – drums, keyboards
 Geoff Cain – bass
 Peter Bowman – guitars, backing vocalsGuest artist
David Hirschfelder – keyboards on "Always And Ever"

Chart positions

Weekly charts

Year-End charts

Certifications

References

1990 debut albums
Southern Sons albums